Neil Middleditch (born 7 January 1957 in Wimborne, Dorset) is a former speedway rider and the team manager of the Poole Pirates. His father Ken was a former rider with the Poole Pirates. He was the team manager of the Great Britain national speedway team for seven years before resigning in February 2008, a position he has since resumed.

Riding career
Middleditch's riding career spanned from 1973 until 1986, riding for the Eastbourne Eagles, Poole Pirates, Reading Racers and the Arena Essex Hammers. In 1975 Middleditch became British Under-21 Champion and was third in the 1978 European Under-21 Championship final. In 1985 he became National League Riders Champion.

Management career

Poole Pirates 
Middleditch became the Poole Pirates team manager in 1999 and by the end of the 2022 season he had steered the club to a total of 10 league titles, eight of which were in the top flight of British Speedway (2003,2004, 2008, 2011, 2013, 2014, 2015 and 2018) and claimed back-to-back Championship (second tier) titles in 2021 and 2022. 'Middlos' impressive trophy haul has been augmented by silverware successes in the Craven Shield in both 2001 and 2002 and again in 2006, before winning the same competition again in 2012 and 2014, 2015, 2016 when it was renamed the Elite Shield and then in 2017 and 2018 in the rebranded Premiership Shield.   He has Knockout cup victories in 2003, 2004, 2010, 2011, 2012, 2021 and 2022 (the first five in British speedway's top flight, the latter two at Championship level), and also a British League cup title from 2003 to be proud of, a total of 28 trophies in 23 active season's (as the 2020 campaign was cancelled due to Covid-19 restrictions)

Great Britain 
Middleditch was appointed as team manager of Great Britain speedway team in 2001 after the resignations of joint managers Colin Pratt and Eric Boocock. In 2004 Great Britain lost out on the World Cup by a single point with Middleditch at the helm.  During the BSPA's 2007 annual general meeting, Middleditch announced that he wanted to continue as the Great Britain manager but recommended that 1992 World Champion Gary Havelock should be his successor once he has retired from racing. In February 2008 Middleditch quit his role as the Great Britain manager after seven years in charge to focus on his family business.

References

External links 
 https://www.worldspeedwayriders.org/rider/33/neil-middleditch

1957 births
Living people
British speedway riders
English motorcycle racers
Lakeside Hammers riders
Poole Pirates riders
Reading Racers riders
Eastbourne Eagles riders
Exeter Falcons riders
Wolverhampton Wolves riders
Oxford Cheetahs riders
People from Wimborne Minster
Sportspeople from Dorset